Lee Se-na (born March 16, 1982) is a South Korean actress.

Career 

She graduated from Yeoju Institute of Technology with a bachelor's degree in pottery and film studies from Dongguk University. She debuted in 2007 through an Anycall television commercial for Samsung Electronics. In 2007, a UCC video clip titled "Pottery Girl" (도자기녀) made headlines about his girlfriend making pottery for her boyfriend ahead of Valentine's Day.

Filmography

Television series

Film

References

External links 
 
 
 

21st-century South Korean actresses
South Korean television actresses
South Korean film actresses
1982 births
Living people